Kasu Irukkanum is a 2007 Tamil language thriller film directed by R. Kumaran and Priyavan, produced by R. P. Poorani, and editing by P. Mohanraj. The film stars newcomer Vishwa, Payal, Nanditha Jennifer, Laksha, Kadhal Sukumar, Arul, and K. Bhagyaraj, while J. Livingston, Anusha, Singamuthu, Kovai Senthil, and Bonda Mani playing supporting roles. The film had music by Kavin Saradha and Raj Shankar, cinematography by R. K. Kumar, and editing by P. Mohanraj. The film released on 4 May 2007.

Plot

Ashok (Vishwa), Ani (Payal), Viji (Nanditha Jennifer), Divya (Laksha), Pravin (Kadhal Sukumar) and Tharun (Arul) are good friends, and their only aim in life is to make money. They steal from banks, hijack container trucks, and rob rich people. They had been actively sought by the police. The police inspector Manikkavel (J. Livingston) is charged to catch them. The friends on the run travel from town to town and are later hosted by a mysterious man named G. R. (K. Bhagyaraj) in his bungalow. The fugitives introduce themselves as youngsters who were lost in the woods.

Ashok and Ani then fall in love with each other, and they decide to get married. Viji, who was secretly in love with Ashok, is heartbroken. In the past, Ashok was a MIS final-year student in Harvard University. When his parents died, Ashok came to his native city, where he realized that his parents were killed by his greedy uncle for inheriting his family's wealth. The innocent Ashok was then sent to a mental asylum by his uncle, his lover, and his best friend who betrayed him for money. Ashok escaped from the mental asylum and killed all three. That day, he realizes that money is the most important thing in life, and so he became a thief.

Thereafter, Divya and Tharun were found dead far from the bungalow. Viji suspects their host G. R. for killing her friends and stabs him with a knife. G. R. confesses that he did not kill them. He also told that his sister Mahalakshmi (Anusha) was killed in the same way. Ashok and Ani reveal to Pravin that they were the murderers, and they murder him. Ashok and Ani wanted to vanish, so they killed their partners who were the only witnesses of their crimes, and their last target is Viji. When Ashok tries to kill Viji, she confesses her love for him. Ashok then changes his mind and accepts her love. Ashok then poisons Ani's drink, and she dies by drinking it. The police finally found their hiding place. Ashok and Viji eventually escape from there.

Ashok and Viji settle in a remote place with their caravan. Viji attempts to kill Ashok for murdering her friends, but she fails and the psychopath Ashok chokes her to death. G. R. tracks Ashok down and tries to murder him for killing his innocent sister, but the police arrive at the right moment and shoot Ashok dead.

Cast

Production
The film producer G. Ramachandran, who has previously produced Manu Needhi (2000) and Sound Party (2004), introduced his son Vishwa as the film's hero. There are three pairs in the film Vishwa, Kadhal Sukumar, and Arul as heroes and Payal, Nanditha Jennifer, and Laksha as heroines. K. Bhagyaraj signed on to play an important role. J. Livingston, Muthukaalai, Singamuthu and Vadivelu David were chosen to act in supporting roles.

Soundtrack

The film score and the soundtrack were composed by film composers Kavin Saradha and Raj Shankar. The soundtrack, released in 2007, features 6 tracks with lyrics written by G. R. and Asura.

Reception
A critic said that Kasu Irukkanum is just another film. Another critic wrote, "Debutant Vishwa (his home production) makes an effort at playing a role with dark shades" and labelled the film as "poor".

References

2007 films
2000s Tamil-language films
Indian thriller films
2007 directorial debut films
2007 thriller films